Bosnia and Herzegovina municipal elections were held on 2 October 2004 to elect municipal mayors and assemblies. The mayoral results are as follow:

Federation of Bosnia and Herzegovina

Republika Srpska

Assembly of Brčko District

References

External links 
 Official Results of Local Elections 2004
 Official Results of Local Elections 2004

Elections in Bosnia and Herzegovina
2004 elections in Europe
Municipal
Municipal elections in Bosnia and Herzegovina